The Singapore Convention on Mediation, formally the United Nations Convention on International Settlement Agreements Resulting from Mediation which was adopted on 20 December 2018 and opened for signature on 7 August 2019, is an international agreement regarding the recognition of mediated settlements. Following the UN General Assembly adopting it on 18 December 2018, the Convention was opened for signature by all States; as of 11 September 2021, it was signed by 55 states. The Convention entered into force on 12 September 2020, that is, six months after the deposit of the third ratification instrument by Qatar, the first two being Singapore and Fiji.

List of States Signatory to the Convention
As of 18 November 2021, 55 states have signed the convention and 8 states have deposited their respective instruments of ratification or approval.

References

External links
 United Nations Convention on International Settlement Agreements Resulting from Mediation
 Singapore Convention on Mediation

Singapore articles needing attention

2019 in Singapore
Treaties concluded in 2018
United Nations treaties
Treaties of Belarus
Treaties of Ecuador
Treaties of Fiji
Treaties of Honduras
Treaties of Qatar
Treaties of Saudi Arabia
Treaties of Singapore
Treaties of Turkey
Mediation